Kiana ( or ) is a city in Northwest Arctic Borough, Alaska, United States. At the 2010 census the population was 361, down from 388 in 2000.

History

Pre Contact

Kiana, meaning where three rivers meet, was founded several centuries ago. Before Kiana became a village, the Inupiat Eskimos tended to travel with certain animal herds; constantly hunting for meat and furs.

In the 1800s, the Inupiaqs of Kiana used to live along the Kobuk River. Throughout the year the villagers would hunt and fish near their houses. They moved to where there was an abundance of animals and fish. The Inupiaqs lived in sod houses, and did not live in them twice, because they would move to where the animals were.

When someone died inside the house they abandoned it, believing they would catch a contagious disease. Instead of building coffins or digging graves, the villagers wrapped the bodies of the deceased in cloths and put poles in them to make a teepee shape.

Archaeological study has been done on the local site 'Igliqtiqsiugvigruaq' (Swift Water Place) which was inhabited by the ancestors of the present day residents of Kiana from 1790 to 1810. The town consisted of burrowed homes connected by tunnels.

Early 20th Century
	The first white men came up with boats in 1898 and changed the way of life. They settled in where is now Kiana. More white men came in 1901 and 1902, and started building houses. Inupiaq women moved to them and married them.

	Archaeologists have discovered a pre-contact Inupaiq village near Kiana. From carbon dating, the archaeologists discovered the village was from the late 1700s to the early 1800s. When more digging was done, they found that some of the houses they excavated were connected with tunnels and passageways. The average house size in the village was about the size of typical one-roomed cabins. Some of the artifacts that were found include metal fragments and shards, as well as glass beads.

Kiana is the central village of the Kobuk river, for Kowagmiut Inupaiq Eskimos. Kiana became known to the Federal Government after a population increase, eventually making the town in to a city, in the year 1915. A United States Post Office was founded in the year 1964.

Before the post office was built, mail came only once a month. The mail transportation method was mainly by dogsled or by walking from one village to another. During this time, Kiana  became a key supply city for coal and gold miners who were posted along the Squirrel River. The Blankenship Trading Post was managed by Walter Blankenship, and later by Robinson Blankenship and Ruth Blankenship Sandvik.  This trading post was the only store with goods such as flour, salt, soda pop, coffee, tea, sugar, and fruit, both dried and canned.

Language

	The first villages in the region to start teaching the Inupiaq language in public school were Ambler, Shungnak, and Kobuk. Then Noorvik and the other villages around the region began teaching it as well. Viola Barr and Rosaline Jackson were the first people in Kiana to teach Inupiaq language as a class in 1971.
	 Before white people came to the region, the children of Kiana grew up speaking the Inupiaq language. Most Kiana students and adults nowadays do not know how to read, write, or speak the language. The region is trying to get the language back so all can speak Inupiaq and make the Elders of Kiana proud. Rosetta Stone and the Inupiaq Language Commission are helping this effort.

Geography
Kiana is located at  (66.971720, -160.430168).

	The village of Kiana is located where three rivers meet: the Squirrel River, Kobuk River, and big/small channel rivers. Kiana is in the Northwestern Alaska, 30 miles North of the Arctic Circle, and 57 air miles East of Kotzebue.

Climate

	In Kiana, there are of frequent storms and extreme temperature swings. There is also evidence of climate change occurring in the past 50 years. Evidence of rising temperatures each month, and increased precipitation (except July) has also been recorded. 
	
	The snowfall is significant, at about 60 inches per year, and the rainfall is 16 inches on average. The Kobuk River is navigable by boat from May to October, and frozen for the remainder of the year.

Demographics

Kiana first appeared on the 1920 U.S. Census as an unincorporated native village. It formally incorporated in 1964.

As of 2013, the total population in Kiana was 361, 101 occupied households, and 77 families. Average people per household: 3.

The median income for a household in 2011, was $39,688, and the median income for a family was $41,667. Males had a median income of $31,250 versus $35,938 for females. The per capita income for the city was $11,534.  About 5.6% of families and 11.2% of the population were below the poverty line, including 9.1% of those under age 18 and 12.5% of those age 65 or over.

People in Community

Average Age

Race

Politics
Kiana has a city administrator who is ultimately responsible for the day-to-day operations of the facilities and to carry out the vision and the mission that is set forth by the City Council and the Mayor who are both elected by the people.  The mayor's responsibility is to help set the focus of the Council.

Tom Cyrus was mayor of Kiana for 7 years, from 2003 to 2010. During that time, the city and traditional council worked closely. They decided to merge the two governments and formed a joint council since they were working with similar visions. The merged organization held joint council meetings and planning sessions.  They had one executive director, one accountant, and a city clerk.  All administrative positions were moved into one building and they streamlined costs by not duplicating services.  At that time, there was limited funding available to municipal governments and there were more opportunities for money through BIA funds and tribal government. In 2009, the goals began to change and it was decided to separate the two governments, with the goal of making the city and traditional governments financially solvent again.

Some of the issues that the mayor deals with include looking for funding, supervising the water and sewer plant, managing the village power, and dealing with wildlife in the community. The mayor also has to assist the council and community with long range planning.
  
Kiana's current mayor, Brad Reich, became mayor when Tom Cyrus resigned in 2009. The full resignation took a year, and Reich become mayor.

Education
The Kiana School, operated by the Northwest Arctic Borough School District, serves the community.  it had 123 students, with Alaska Natives making up 97% of the student body.

Transportation
There are many types and uses of transportation in and around Kiana, and include travel over both land and water.

The types of land transportation used by the people in Kiana are all terrain vehicles, cars, trucks, and snow machines.  They are used for a variety of reasons such as for getting around the village and just riding around.

Some vehicles are used to travel between villages. In the winter, an ice road is usually plowed or formed on the Kobuk River from Kiana to Noorvik, and extends all the way to Kotzebue.  In the summer, the people of Kiana use the same routes on motor boats to get to other villages.

In all seasons, people use bush airplanes to get to all other villages in the region. Bob Baker Memorial Airport is located one mile from the city. Bering Air and Ravn Air provide service to Kotzebue and other locations.

The barge system that services Kiana is Crowley Marine Services. This system goes to Kiana every summer, bringing gas, fuel, and other useful products. Store owners use large boats to ship goods upriver.

Cost of transportation is very significant. For example, the costs of gas and reservations to go on a bush plane are very high. Bering Air costs are : round trip to Kotzebue $324, and to Noorvik $180. With Ravn Air:Round trip to Kotzebue is $240, and to Noorvik $160. The gas prices vary : at the Kiana City Office, it costs $7.21, with tax, for one gallon of gas. At Lee's Sea Air (store in Kiana), it's $12 for one gallon.

References

Cities in Alaska
Cities in Northwest Arctic Borough, Alaska
Populated places of the Arctic United States